Ricardo Moniz (born 17 June 1964) is a Dutch professional football manager and former player who is the head coach of Hungarian Nemzeti Bajnokság I club Zalaegerszeg.

Career
He played for RKC Waalwijk, HFC Haarlem, Helmond Sport and FC Eindhoven.

Coaching career
He was formerly a skills trainer at Tottenham Hotspur, leaving the club in May 2008 after three seasons.

Moniz is one of the few proteges of the skills training guru Wiel Coerver which is aimed at improving technical ability over tactical ability. He was previously an academy coach at PSV Eindhoven.

On 8 June 2008, he signed a new contract to be the new skills and talent coach next to head coach Martin Jol at Hamburger SV. On 26 April 2010, he was named the interim head coach by Hamburger SV, replacing Bruno Labbadia for the last two games in the season 2009/2010. He was in that position until Armin Veh was hired on 24 May 2010.

Salzburg
Ricardo was then appointed the Global Director of Youth Development for Red Bull.  Responsible for academies in 4 continents. After the resignations of Huub Stevens and Dietmar Beiersdorfer on 8 April 2011, Moniz was named the new head coach of FC Red Bull Salzburg.

Ricardo won the League and Cup double with FC Red Bull Salzburg.  Becoming the first manager in Salzburg history (Austria and Red Bull Salzburg) to achieve a league and cup double.

In June 2012 he resigned after internal differences.

Ferencváros
On 21 August 2012, Ricardo Moniz was appointed as the new manager of the Hungarian League club Ferencvárosi TC.
At FTC his devotion to football became immediately popular among fans and many successes followed. Yet, struggling with difficult circumstances, on 2 December 2013, Moniz was sacked by Ferencvárosi TC due to poor performance of the team.

Ricardo was voted the Austrian manager of the year for the 2011/2012 season and achieved the Hungarian Players Union Manager of the Year in 2012/2013.

Gdansk
On 27 March 2014, he was named a new coach of Lechia Gdańsk, and successfully brought them to their highest ever league position, of 4th. On 4 June 2014 he resigned from his position for personal reasons. Shortly after resigning from Lechia, he became new manager of 1860 Munich, where he made the then 18 year old Julian Weigl captain. Moniz was sacked on 24 September 2014.

Notts County
On 7 April 2015, Moniz was appointed manager of the League One club Notts County on a three-year contract. He was sacked on 29 December 2015 with Notts 15th in League Two .

Eindhoven
In July 2016 he became new manager of FC Eindhoven. He left the club at the end of the 2016–17 season.

Randers
On 8 October 2017, Ricardo Moniz was signed up as new manager of Danish Superliga club Randers FC. He was sacked by the Randers FC board of directors on 26 January 2018, after only 9 games as head coach.

Trencin
On 2 June 2018, Moniz was appointed the new head coach of Slovak Super Liga club Trenčín. In October 2018, after only a few months in charge, he announced that he was leaving the club, citing widespread corruption in Slovak football as the reason.

Excelsior
On 8 April 2019, Excelsior confirmed the appointment of Ricardo Moniz as their head coach until the end of the season.

On 28 January 2020, Excelsior decided to terminate the contract with Ricardo Moniz, after disappointing results in the 2019-2020 Eerste Divisie.

Zalaegerszeg
On 25 May 2022, it was announced that Moniz had been appointed head coach of Hungarian Nemzeti Bajnokság I club Zalaegerszeg.

In the 2022-23 Nemzeti Bajnokság I season, Zalaegerszeg hosted Honvéd. During the match, Honvéd fans shouted racist comments. After the match, Moniz heavily criticized the referee for not terminating the match.

In October 2022, Moniz was suspended by the Hungarian Football Federation.

In an interview, published on Nemzeti Sport, Moniz said that Zalaegerszeg cannot purchase top players, therefore, a bigger emphasis should be placed on the youth academies.

On 25 February 2023, Moniz paid tribute to Miklós Lendvai, died at the age of 48, by beating Fehérvár in the 2022-23 Nemzeti Bajnokság I season.

Personal life
Moniz was born in the Netherlands to a Surinamese father, and an Indonesian mother of Chinese descent.

Coaching record

Honours
Red Bull Salzburg
 Austrian Bundesliga: 2011–12
 Austrian Cup: 2011–12

Ferencváros
 Hungarian League Cup: 2012–13

References

1964 births
Living people
Dutch footballers
RKC Waalwijk players
Dutch expatriate sportspeople in the United Arab Emirates
HFC Haarlem players
Helmond Sport players
Dutch expatriate sportspeople in England
FC Eindhoven players
Eredivisie players
Eerste Divisie players
Dutch sportspeople of Surinamese descent
Dutch people of Indonesian descent
Footballers from Haarlem
Dutch expatriate sportspeople in Germany
Tottenham Hotspur F.C. non-playing staff
Expatriate footballers in Belgium
Association football defenders
Hamburger SV managers
Lechia Gdańsk managers
TSV 1860 Munich managers
Dutch expatriate sportspeople in Belgium
Dutch expatriate sportspeople in Austria
Expatriate football managers in Germany
Expatriate football managers in Austria
Expatriate football managers in England
Dutch expatriate football managers
Notts County F.C. managers
English Football League managers
FC Eindhoven managers
FC Red Bull Salzburg managers
Excelsior Rotterdam managers
Expatriate football managers in Hungary
Dutch expatriate sportspeople in Slovakia
Dutch expatriate sportspeople in Hungary
Dutch expatriate sportspeople in Poland
Dutch expatriate sportspeople in Switzerland
Dutch expatriate sportspeople in Denmark
Nemzeti Bajnokság I managers
Zalaegerszegi TE managers